Brig o' Turk is a small rural village historically in Perthshire and today within the council area of Stirling, Scotland. It is situated in the Trossachs, a range of hills on the A821 road.

Features
Brig o' Turk has a rare 1930s wooden tea room, which featured in the 1959 remake of The 39 Steps.
Brig o' Turk also features a village hall which hosts many craft fairs, dances and other events, a small primary school (Trossachs Primary of 1875) serving the village and the surrounding areas, a small post office (located in someone's house) and a pub-restaurant, called The Byre Inn, which is made to look like the cow barn attached to the large neighbouring house, Dundarroch.  The Bicycle Tree, located half a mile north of the village, is a local landmark and tourist attraction.

Trossachs Parish Church
The Church of Scotland parish church, called the Trossachs Parish Church, is located to the west of the village overlooking Loch Achray. It was built in 1849 in the early Gothic style, to cater for tourists visiting the area. It contains a memorial plaque to Major-General David Limond C.B. (1831–1895), a veteran of the Siege of Lucknow in the Indian Mutiny. The church, together with the graveyard and boundary wall, is a Category C(S) listed building.

History

Etymology
The village is named after the Brig o'Turk bridge over the River Turk. The bridge was built in 1796 and lies to the west of the village, although bridges have crossed the river since 1451.

Jacobite insurgency
In 1708, Brig o' Turk was the venue for a gathering of prominent Jacobite lairds in support of the expected invasion by James Stuart, the "Old Pretender". In the event, the commander of the French fleet of 30 ships carrying James's 6,000-strong force withdrew rather than risk an action with the Royal Navy; however, the gathering later was used as evidence of treason against the participants.

Ruskin
In the mid nineteenth century the village was the location of a famous Victorian love triangle involving John Ruskin, his wife Effie Gray, and  protégé John Everett Millais.

Community
There are a number of community groups based in the area such as the Trossachs Welfare association, Trossachs Community Council and Trossachs Community Trust.

References

External links

 Brig o' Turk on "Destination Loch Lomond"
 Brig o' Turk on "Trossachs" website

Populated places in Stirling (council area)
Trossachs